The men's 1000 metres race of the 2013–14 ISU Speed Skating World Cup 5, arranged in Eisstadion Inzell, in Inzell, Germany, was held on 8 March 2014.

Shani Davis of the United States won, while Stefan Groothuis of the Netherlands came second, and Brian Hansen came third. Mark Tuitert of the Netherlands won the Division B race.

Results
The race took place on Saturday, 8 March, with Division B scheduled in the morning session, at 11:15, and Division A scheduled in the afternoon session, at 15:41.

Division A

Division B

References

Men 1000
5